Basilica of Our Lady of the Assumption ( is a Roman Catholic church in the town of Genoa, in the Province of Genoa and the region of Liguria, Italy. This church was constructed during 1610–1624.  The Baroque-style facade was added in 1932, design of the architect Piero de Barbieri; the sculptor Luigi Venzano contributed the facade statues of St. John the Baptist and St. Joseph, while the central relief depicts the Madonna.  The interior was decorated across the centuries and includes works by Giulio Benso, Domenico Piola, Nicolò Barabino, and Gian Stefano Rossi.

It should not be confused with the distinct Santa Maria Assunta also called Santa Maria di Carignano.

Notes

Roman Catholic churches completed in 1624
17th-century Roman Catholic church buildings in Italy
Nostra Signora Assunta
Baroque architecture in Liguria
Minor basilicas in Liguria